James Knowles may refer to:

James Sheridan Knowles (1784–1862), Irish dramatist and actor
James Thomas Knowles (1806–1884), English architect
James Thomas Knowles (1831–1908), English architect and editor of The Nineteenth Century
James Knowles (aviator) (1896–1971), World War I ace
James Knowles (footballer, born 1881) (1881–1923), English footballer
Jim Knowles (American football) (born 1965), defensive coordinator at Ohio State University
Jim Knowles (football manager), manager of Tranmere Rovers, 1936–1939
Jimmy Knowles (baseball) (1856–1912), baseball player
James Knowles (murderer), Ku Klux Klan member responsible for the lynching of Michael Donald
James Knowles III (born 1980), mayor of Ferguson, Missouri
James Hinton Knowles, British missionary to Kashmir
Jimmy Knowles (footballer) (born 2002), English footballer playing for Mansfield Town F.C.